The following outline is provided as an overview of and topical guide to human intelligence:

Human intelligence is, in the human species, the mental capacities to learn, understand, and reason, including the capacities to comprehend ideas, plan, solve problems, and use language to communicate.

Traits and aspects

In groups 
 Collective intelligence
 Collective wisdom
 Common sense

In individuals

Emergence and evolution 

 Noogenesis

Augmented with technology 

 Humanistic intelligence

Capacities 

Cognition and mental processing

Types of people, by intelligence

High 
 Child prodigy
 List of child prodigies
 Genius
 Polymath

Low 
 Intellectual disability

Models and theories 
 Cattell–Horn–Carroll theory
 Fluid and crystallized intelligence
 General factor of intelligence 
 Theory of multiple intelligences
 Triarchic theory of intelligence
 PASS theory of intelligence
 Parieto-frontal integration theory
 Vernon's verbal-perceptual model
 g-VPR model

Related factors 
 Impact of health on intelligence
 Environment and intelligence
 Height and intelligence
 Neurological factors upon intelligence
 Race and intelligence
 Nations and intelligence
 Sex differences in intelligence
 Religiosity and intelligence

Fields that study human intelligence 
 Cognitive epidemiology
 Evolution of human intelligence
 Heritability of IQ
 Mental chronometry
 Intelligence and public policy
 Behavioural genetics
 Human behavior genetics

Psychometrics: measurement 

 Psychometrics
 Flynn effect
 Educational quotient
 g factor
 Heritability of IQ
 Intelligence quotient
 Ammons Quick Test
Army General Classification Test
 Block design test
 Bracken School Readiness Assessment
 Cattell Culture Fair III
Cognitive Abilities Test
Differential Ability Scales
 Figure Reasoning Test
 Intelligence quotient
 Jensen box
 Kaufman Assessment Battery for Children
 Knox Cubes
 Kohs block design test
 Leiter International Performance Scale
 Lothian birth-cohort studies
 Miller Analogies Test
 NNAT
 Otis–Lennon School Ability Test
 Peabody Picture Vocabulary Test
 Porteus Maze Test
 Raven's Progressive Matrices
 Reynolds Intellectual Assessment Scales
 Stanford–Binet Intelligence Scales
 Wechsler Adult Intelligence Scale
 Wechsler Intelligence Scale for Children
 Wechsler Preschool and Primary Scale of Intelligence
 Wonderlic Test
 Woodcock-Johnson Tests of Cognitive Abilities
 Standardized testing

History 

 Evolution of human intelligence
 History of the race and intelligence controversy

Organizations 
 High IQ societies
 Intertel
Mega Society
 Mensa International
 Prometheus Society
 Triple Nine Society

Publications 
 Intelligence (journal)

Scholars and researchers

See also

Further reading

  The second edition of a leading textbook on human intelligence, used in highly selective universities throughout the English-speaking world, with extensive references to research literature. 
  First edition of a comprehensive textbook by a veteran scholar of human intelligence. 
  Major review article in a flagship publication of the American Psychological Association, a thorough review of current research.

  Authoritative handbook for graduate students and practitioners, with chapters by a variety of authors on most aspects of human intelligence.

External links 

 APA Task Force Examines the Knowns and Unknowns of Intelligence - American Psychologist, February 1996
 The cognitive-psychology approach vs. psychometric approach to intelligence - American Scientist magazine
 History of Influences in the Development of Intelligence Theory and Testing - Developed by Jonathan Plucker at Indiana University

Scholarly journals and societies
Intelligence (journal homepage)
International Society for Intelligence Research (homepage)

Human intelligence
Human intelligence